James Lawler may refer to:
 James F. Lawler (born 1935), American politician
 James R. Lawler (1929–2013), Australian literary critic

See also
James Lawlor (disambiguation)